10 Trombones Like 2 Pianos is an album by composer, arranger and conductor Pete Rugolo featuring performances recorded in 1960 and first released on the Mercury label as part of its audiophile Perfect Presence Sound Series.

Reception

The AllMusic review by  noted:

Track listing
 "Marie" (Irving Berlin) - 2:10
 "Moonglow/'Theme from Picnic" (Will Hudson, Irving Mills, Eddie DeLange/George Duning, Steve Allen) - 2:38
 "Let There Be Love" (Lionel Rand, Ian Grant) - 1:40
 "Like Love" (André Previn, Dory Langdon) - 2:32
 "Willow Weep for Me"  (Ann Ronnell) - 3:14
 "Intermission Riff" (Ray Wetzel) - 4:02
 "Love Is Just Around the Corner" (Lewis E. Gensler, Leo Robin) - 3:12
 "Angel Eyes" (Matt Dennis,  Earl Brent) - 3:44
 "Love Is Here to Stay" (George Gershwin, Ira Gershwin) - 3:12
 "It's a Most Unusual Day" (Jimmy McHugh, Harold Adamson)	- 2:08
 "Basin Street East" (McHugh, Rugolo) - 2:10
 "Ten Trombones Like" (Rugolo) - 3:17
Recorded at United Recording Studios, Hollywood, CA on May 10, 1960 (tracks 2, 4, 6-8 & 11) and May 12, 1960 (tracks 1, 3, 5, 9, 10 & 12).

Personnel
Pete Rugolo - arranger, conductor
Milt Bernhart, Harry Betts, Bob Fitzpatrick, Vern Friley, Herbie Harper (tracks 2, 4, 6-8 & 11), Francis “Joe” Howard (tracks 2, 4, 6-8 & 11), Dick Nash (tracks 1, 3, 5, 9, 10 & 12), Dick Noel  (tracks 1, 3, 5, 9, 10 & 12), Bob Pring, Frank Rosolino - trombone
Russell Brown, George Roberts (tracks 1, 3, 5, 9, 10 & 12), Ken Shroyer (tracks 2, 4, 6-8 & 11) - bass trombone
Russ Freeman, John Williams  (tracks 2, 4, 6-8 & 11), Claude Williamson (tracks 1, 3, 5, 9, 10 & 12) - piano 
Red Mitchell - bass
Shelly Manne - drums

References

Pete Rugolo albums
1960 albums
Mercury Records albums
Albums arranged by Pete Rugolo
Albums conducted by Pete Rugolo